Tu' mir nicht weh is the eighth German single recorded by U. S. entertainer Connie Francis.

The single's A-side is a German cover version of Francis' U. S. # 1 hit Don't Break the Heart That Loves You, which Francis also recorded in

Italian (as Un desiderio folle)
Japanese
Neapolitan (as Un desiderio folle)
Spanish (as Mi corazón te adora)

The single's B-Side was Paradiso, a song written especially in German for Francis.

"Tu' mir nicht weh" peaked at # 2 of the German charts, while "Paradiso" peaked at # 1, marking this record as Francis first double-sided single in Germany of which the B-side scored better on the charts than the A-side.

Subsequently, "Paradiso" became one of the biggest hits of the year 1962 with cover versions in 
Dutch (recorded by Anneke Grönloh)
Finnish (recorded by Laila Kinnunen)
French (recorded by Connie Francis)
Malayan (recorded by Anneke Grönloh

References

1962 singles
Connie Francis songs
Songs written by Benny Davis
1962 songs
MGM Records singles
Songs written by Fini Busch